Eye Dance is the eighth and final studio album by the vocal group Boney M., released in 1985. The cover artwork was symbolic of the state the group was in at that time, as neither the famous "Boney M." logo nor the group members appeared on the cover, and were replaced by an anonymous drawing.

Eye Dance was recorded with a number of session singers. Original group members Liz Mitchell and Marcia Barrett only appeared on a few of the tracks, the main focus being on Reggie Tsiboe. The singles "My Cherie Amour" and "Young Free and Single" were promoted by Boney M. as a quintet, with former group member Bobby Farrell back in the line-up; both these singles and the album were resounding failures, both critically and commercially, and in early 1986 the band and producer Frank Farian went their separate ways after a "10 Years Boney M." anniversary TV special.

Track listing

"Young, Free and Single" (Mary Susan Applegate, Frank Farian, Robert Rayen) - 4:10 
"Todos Buenos"  (Mary Susan Applegate, Frank Farian) -  4:34 
"Give It Up" (Bernd Dietrich, Gerd Grabowski, Engelbert Simons) -  3:58 
"Sample City"  (Rainer Maria Ehrhardt, Frank Farian) -  3:43 
"My Cherie Amour" (Henry Cosby, Sylvia Moy, Stevie Wonder) - 4:04
"Eye Dance"  (Mary Susan Applegate, Frank Farian, Pit Löw) - 4:04 
"Got Cha Loco"  (Mary Susan Applegate, Harald Baierl, Frank Farian, Robert Rayen) - 3:34 
"Dreadlock Holiday"  (Graham Gouldman, Eric Stewart) - 4:52 
"Chica da Silva" (Catherine Courage, Frank Farian, Hans-Jörg Mayer "Reyam") - 5:33 
"Bang Bang Lulu"  (Traditional, Frank Farian, Peter Bischof-Fallenstein) - 3:01

Personnel
 Reggie Tsiboe - lead vocals (track 1, 5, 8 & 10), backing vocals
 Liz Mitchell - lead vocals (track 7 , 2 & 9), backing vocals
 Frank Farian - lead vocals (track 2, 4, 6) backing vocals
 Marcia Barrett - backing vocals
 Bobby Farrell - vocoder vocals (track 1)
 Rhonda Heath (La Mama) - vocals (track 2 & 3)
 Madeleine Davis (La Mama) - vocals (track 2 & 3)
 Patricia Shockley (La Mama) - vocals (track 2 & 3)
 Amy Goff - backing vocals (track 1, 5, 8 & 10)
 Elaine Goff - backing vocals (track 1, 5, 8 & 10)
 Harry Baierl - keyboards
 Mats Björklund - keyboards, guitar, bass
 Pit Löw - keyboards
 Curt Cress - drums

Production
 Frank Farian - producer
 Harry Baierl - arranger, programmer
 Mats Björklund - arranger, programmer
 Pit Löw - arranger, programmer
 Bernd Berwanger - sound engineer
 Carmine Di - engineer
 Michael Bestmann - engineer
 Tammy Grohé - engineer 
 David Simic - artwork, cover design  
 Recorded and mixed at Far Studios, Rosbach and Basic Studio, Munich.

Reissued
 1994: CD, BMG, 74321 21264 2
 2007: CD, Sony BMG Music Entertainment, 88697094842
 2017: Boney M. Complete, 9 LP, Sony Music, 88985406971

References

External links
 Discogs.com, detailed discography
 [ Allmusic, biography, discography etc.]

1985 albums
Boney M. albums
Albums produced by Frank Farian
Hansa Records albums